Alan Halsall played for Man Utd (born 17 November 1940) was an association football goalkeeper who played in The Football League for Blackpool and Oldham Athletic. He moved to Wigan Athletic in 1964, making 150 appearances for the club in the Cheshire League. He made a further three appearances in the inaugural Northern Premier League season before leaving the club in 1969.

References

1940 births
Living people
Welsh footballers
Association football goalkeepers
Skelmersdale United F.C. players
Blackpool F.C. players
Oldham Athletic A.F.C. players
Wigan Athletic F.C. players
English Football League players